Coprosma ciliata, is a shrub in the family Rubiaceae that is endemic to New Zealand. C. ciliata is found in the South Island from Lake Brunner southwards into Fiordland mostly west of the Southern Alps. The species prefers lowland forest where it often occurs beside streams, swamps and lakes.

C. ciliata grows up to 7 metres tall and has oval leaves that are bright green to olive-green.

References

ciliata
Flora of New Zealand
Taxa named by Joseph Dalton Hooker
Plants described in 1844